Tonya may refer to:

 Tonya (name), the given name, and people by that name
 Tonya, Turkey, a town and district of Trabzon Province in the Black Sea region of Turkey
 Tonya, Uganda
 Ton'ya (問屋) trade brokers of ancient Japan

See also
 I, Tonya (2017 film) film about Tonya Harding
 Hoima–Kaiso–Tonya Road in Uganda
 Tanya (disambiguation)
 Tania (disambiguation)
 Tanja (disambiguation)
 Tonia (disambiguation)